Karl Parkinson is an Irish author based in Dublin. He has published three collections of poetry, a novel, and a short story collection.

Writing career 
Parkinson has published three collections of poetry, Litany of the City (Wurmpress 2013) and Butterflies of a Bad Summer (Salmon Poetry 2016). And Sacred Symphony (Culture Matters 2020). In March 2022 Parkinson published a jointly authored collection of poetry with Dave Lordan, Back To Normal (Front Line Press). In July 2022 Front Line Press published Parkinson's first collection of short stories, The Grind. 

In 2016, New Binary Press published Parkinson's debut novel, The Blocks, inspired by the author's childhood in a troubled part of inner-city Dublin. The novel received considerable critical acclaim in Ireland. Aiden O'Reilly writes in The Irish Times that "Parkinson has set himself up unashamedly and without irony as a singer of the human soul in its contrary states of degradation and exaltation".

Personal 
Parkinson grew up in O'Devaney Gardens, described as "one of Dublin’s most troubled and dilapidated complexes". The social housing flats in the area have since been vacated and demolished.

References 

Living people
Date of birth missing (living people)
Irish male poets
Irish male novelists
Writers from Dublin (city)
Year of birth missing (living people)